Peter Markey (1930–2016) was an artist, craftsman and teacher who was especially known for his automata.

See also 
 Ron Fuller (artist)
 Sam Smith (toy-maker)
 Tim Hunkin

References 

1930 births
2016 deaths
Alumni of Swansea Metropolitan University
Toy designers